Xinjiangchelyidae is an extinct family of turtles known from the Lower Jurassic to the Middle Cretaceous of Asia and western Europe. They have generally been interpreted as either being basal cryptodires or placed outside of crown Testudines.

Genera
Annemys Itat Formation, Russia, Middle Jurassic (Bathonian) Qigu Formation, Shishugou Formation, China, Late Jurassic (Oxfordian) Ulan Malgait Formation, Mongolia, Late Jurassic (Tithonian)
Brodiechelys Vectis Formation, United Kingdom, Early Cretaceous (Barremian) Arcillas de Morella Formation, Spain, Early Cretaceous (Aptian)
Camerochelys Enciso Group, Spain, Early Cretaceous (Barremian-Aptian)
Jastmelchyi
Kalasinemys Phu Kradung Formation, Thailand, Tithonian
Larachelus Pinilla de los Moros Formation, Spain, Early Cretaceous (Hauterivian-Barrmeian)
Phunoichelys Phu Kradung Formation, Thailand, Tithonian
Shartegemys Ulan Malgait Formation, Mongolia, Late Jurassic (Tithonian)
Tienfuchelys Shaximiao Formation, China, Middle-Upper Jurassic 
Undjulemys Onjüül locality, Mongolia, Late Jurassic
Xinjiangchelys Middle Jurassic-Early Cretaceous, Asia
Protoxinjiangchelys Xintiangou Formation, China, Lower-Middle Jurassic

References

Testudinata
Prehistoric reptile families